Daniel Hägele (born 23 February 1989) is a German professional footballer who plays as a midfielder for Würzburger Kickers.

Career
In 2007, Hägele moved from the under-19 team of SSV Ulm 1846 to VfR Aalen. There, he mainly appeared for the second team. In the 2008–09 season, however, he also played for the first team in the 3. Liga. In the summer of 2010 he returned to Ulm. After six months, he moved to SG Sonnenhof Großaspach. In the summer of 2013, Hägele was also appointed team captain of the Aspach-based team. With the club, he celebrated promotion to the 3. Liga in 2014 as champion of the Regionalliga Südwest. Hägele made a total of 220 competitive appearances in which he scored 11 goals for the club, during his seven-year stint there.

For the 2018–19 season, Hägele moved to the Würzburger Kickers and signed a contract valid until June 2020. He soon established himself as a starter and played a significant role in the team's stout defense. After the retirement of Sebastian Schuppan, Hägele was appointed team captain after the club had managed promotion to the 2. Bundesliga in 2020.

Honours
SG Sonnenhof Großaspach
 Regionalliga Südwest: 2013–14

Würzburger Kickers
3. Liga runners-up: 2019–20
Bavarian Cup: 2018–19

References

External links

1989 births
Living people
People from Schwäbisch Gmünd
Sportspeople from Stuttgart (region)
German footballers
Association football defenders
1. FC Normannia Gmünd players
SSV Ulm 1846 players
VfR Aalen players
SG Sonnenhof Großaspach players
Würzburger Kickers players
Regionalliga players
3. Liga players
2. Bundesliga players
Footballers from Baden-Württemberg